The AEROVIDE GmbH (formerly aerodyn Energiesysteme GmbH) is a German company and engineering consultancy that develops wind turbines.
Its headquarters are located in Rendsburg, Schleswig-Holstein.

History 
The company was founded in 1983 by pioneers Sönke Siegfriedsen., Robert Müller and Friedrich-Wilhelm Frank as “aerodyn” in Damendorf. 
In 1986 the company changed to “aerodyn Energiesysteme GmbH”. Rainer Osthorst enter the company in 1991, Markus Rees in 1993. In 1994 the company moved from Damendorf to Rendsburg (Germany).
The company works on commissions and own projects.

1997 the companies aerodyn Energiesysteme GmbH and Denker&Wulf GmbH&Co.Kg founded a joint subsidiary named “pro+pro Energiesysteme GmbH” in 1997 to develop a 1500 kW wind turbine system.
In 2000 Denker and Wulf push ahead the amalgamation of pro+pro, HSW, BWU, and Jacobs Energie, into Repower Systems AG. aerodyn has dropped out of this merger.
 
In 2010, work on an offshore wind park in China with the Chinese company Zhejiang Windey Engineering started.
 
In 2013, founder Siegfriedsen left the company and Markus Rees and Rainer Osthorst became directors.

Since 2020 the company is solely owned by the Managing Directors Markus Rees and Rainer Osthorst.

End of the year 2020 the trade mark agreement ends and a re-naming of the company into “AEROVIDE GmbH” was necessary.

Company 
Since 2006, Aerodyn is active in China and had in 2008 already 75% of their sales in China. Today, 90% of their revenue is made in Asia. 
Many manufacturers manufacture wind turbines or rotor blades on the basis of the prototype developments from AEROVIDE (former aerodyn), f.e. HSW, Jacobs Energie, BWU, Fuhrländer, A&R SGL Rotec, EUROS, Südwind Borsig Energy, DeWind, Jeumont, Tacke, Pioneer Wincon Energy Systems Private Limited, SINOI, Ventis, Autoflug, Tacke Windtechnik, Senvion, Goldwind, Pfleiderer, AREVA Multibrid, WinWind, CSIC HZ Windpower, BARD Offshore, SANY, Shanghai Electric, CNBM, Mingyang Wind Power, Goudian United Power, HEAG, UNISON, China Windey, Hyosung Heavy Industries. POWEEND S.A.S.

Awards 
 1999: IF Design Award for "Multibrid"
 2009: Husum WindEnergy AWARD - SCD
 2014: Bronze Medal Award by Windpower Monthly: drive trains aeroMaster 3.0
 2012-2015: Sönke Siegfriedsen amongst the Top 30 people of Wind Power Monthly
 2016: German Renewables Award for Sönke Siegfriedsen
 2020: Gold Medal Award by Windpower Monthly: 111m rotor blade

References 
-->

Other Sources 
 
 
 

Wind turbine manufacturers
German companies established in 1983